Chaim Buchbinder (חיים בוכבינדר; also "Haim"; born 1943) is an Israeli former basketball player. He scored 6,044 career points, the 7th-most in Israel Basketball Premier League history.

Biography
Buchbinder played 11 seasons for Maccabi Haifa in the Israel Basketball Premier League from 1962 to 1972. He scored 6,044 career points, the 7th-most in Israel Basketball Premier League history.

See also
Israeli Basketball Premier League Statistical Leaders

References 

1943 births
Living people
Israeli men's basketball players
Maccabi Haifa B.C. players
Israeli Basketball Premier League players